General Jones may refer to:

United Kingdom
Sir Charles Phibbs Jones (1906–1988), British Army general lieutenant general
Daniel Jones (British Army officer) (1793) was a British Army 
Sir Edward Jones (British Army officer) (1936–2007), British Army general
Sir George Jones (Royal Marines officer) ( –1857), British Marine Corps general
Sir Harry Jones (British Army officer) (1791–1866), British Army general
Henry Richmond Jones (1808–1880), British Army general
Sir Howard Sutton Jones (1835–1912), British Marine Corps general
Inigo Jones (British Army officer) (1848–1914), British Army major general
Ivan Jones (British Army officer) (born 1966), British Army lieutenant general
Sir John Thomas Jones (1783–1843), British Army major general
Leslie Cockburn Jones, British Army major general
Lumley Jones (1887–1918), British Army brigadier general
Richard Jones (East India Company officer) (1754–1835), British East India Company lieutenant general
Rupert Jones (British Army officer) (born 1969), British Army major general
Seymour Willoughby Anketell-Jones (1898-1972), British Army brigadier general
Sir William Jones (British Army officer) (1808-1890), British Army general

United States

U.S. Army
Alan W. Jones (1894–1969), U.S. Army major general
Albert M. Jones (1890–1967), U.S. Army major general
Anthony R. Jones (born 1948), U.S. Army lieutenant general
George M. Jones (1911–1996), U.S. Army brigadier general
Herbert M. Jones, U.S. Army major general
James I. Jones (1786–1858), U.S. Army major general
John J. Jones (general) (1828–1868), Union Army brigadier general
Lloyd E. Jones (1889–1958), U.S. Army major general
Patrick Henry Jones (1830–1900), Union Army brigadier general
Reuben D. Jones (fl. 1980s–2010s), U.S. Army major general
Roger Jones (Adjutant General) (1789–1852), U.S. Army brevet major general
Roger Jones (Inspector General) (1831–1889), Union Army brigadier general

U.S. Air Force
David C. Jones (1921–2013), U.S. Air Force General
David M. Jones (1913–2008), U.S. Air Force major general
Harley Sanford Jones (1902–1997), U.S. Air Force brigadier general
Hiram "Doc" Jones, U.S. Air Force brigadier general
James G. Jones (1934– ), U.S. Air Force major general
Junius Wallace Jones (1890–1977), U.S. Air Force major general

U.S. Marine Corps
James L. Jones (1943– ), U.S. Marine Corps General
Louis R. Jones (1895-1973), U.S. Marine Corps major general
William K. Jones (1916–1998), U.S. Marine Corps lieutenant general

Confederate States Army
David Rumph Jones (1825–1863), Confederate States Army major general
John M. Jones (1820–1864), Confederate States Army brigadier general
John R. Jones (1827–1901), Confederate States Army brigadier general
Samuel Jones (Confederate Army officer) (1819–1887), Confederate States Army major general
William E. Jones (general) (1824–1864), Confederate States Army brigadier general

Others
Allen Jones (Continental Congress) (1739–1798), North Carolina Militia brigadier general in the American Revolutionary War
Penn Jones Jr. (1914–1998), Texas National Guard brevet brigadier general
Rhys Jones (soldier) (1969– ), New Zealand Army lieutenant general
Rosalie Gardiner Jones (1883-1978), American suffragist known as "General Jones"

See also
Stanhope Bayne-Jones (1888–1970), U.S. Army brigadier general
Percy George Calvert-Jones (1894–1977), British Army major general
Arnold Elzey (Jones) (1816–1871), Confederate States Army major general
DeLancey Floyd-Jones (1826–1902), U.S. Army brigadier general
Sir Love Jones-Parry (British Army officer) (1781–1853), British Army lieutenant general
David Rutherford-Jones (1958– ), British Army major general
Sir Guy Salisbury-Jones (1896–1985), British Army major general
Llewelyn Wansbrough-Jones (1900–1974), British Army major general
Jones (surname)
Attorney General Jones (disambiguation)